In music, Op. 148 stands for Opus number 148. Compositions that are assigned this number include:

 Rheinberger – Organ Sonata No. 11
 Schubert – Notturno
 Schumann – Requiem